The Ocypodoidea, or ocypoid crabs, are a superfamily of crabs, named after the genus Ocypode. It contains over 300 extant species in these eight families:
 Camptandriidae Stimpson, 1858
 Dotillidae Stimpson, 1858
 Heloeciidae H. Milne-Edwards, 1852
 Macrophthalmidae Dana, 1851
 Mictyridae Dana, 1851
 Ocypodidae Rafinesque, 1815
 Ucididae Števčić, 2005
 Xenophthalmidae Stimpson, 1858

References

 
Crabs
Taxa named by Constantine Samuel Rafinesque
Arthropod superfamilies